Port Management Office Misamis Occidental/Ozamiz  is one of the port management offices of the Philippine Ports Authority which oversees all government and private ports in the Province of Misamis Occidental, with the code MOZ.

History
In 1995 TMO Ozamiz was upgraded to Port Management Office as PMO Ozamiz, separated from PMO Iligan, having the jurisdiction over Misamis Occidental and Dipolog City. In 2008, TMO Dapitan became PMO Zamboanga del Norte.

List of Ports Under PPA-PMO Misamis Occidental/Ozamiz

Government Ports
Port of Ozamiz, Ozamiz City, Misamis Occidental (base port) - the headquarters of PMO Misamis Occidental/Ozamiz (MOZ).
 Port of Jimenez, Jimenez, Misamis Occidental - serving the Jimenez oil depots of Petron, Shell and Chevron
 Port of Plaridel, Plaridel, Misamis Occidental - the gateway port of Northwestern Mindanao to Bohol and Siquijor.
 Silanga Port, Tangub City, Misamis Occidental
 Port of Oroquieta, Oroquieta City, Misamis Occidental

Private Ports
 Third Millennium Oil Mill, Jimenez, Misamis Occidental

Statistics

2020
Passenger Movement

Passenger Movement

Container Traffic

Cargo Throughput

Shipcalls

References

Port Management Office Misamis Occidental Ozamiz
Misamis Occidental
Transportation in Mindanao